You Can't Take It With You is the third and final studio album by Long Island band As Tall as Lions. It was released on August 18, 2009. The album debut at #88 on the Billboard Top 200.

History

As Tall As Lions began working on the album in January 2008. By August 2008, they had 12 songs written.

The single "Circles" was posted on the band's MySpace page on June 18, 2009 for streaming. On July 22, "In Case of Rapture" was released for streaming on AbsolutePunk.net as part of an ABSOLUTExclusive on the band.

On August 13, 2009, the entire album was available for streaming on the band's MySpace page. The album was officially released on August 18; that day, it appeared on the iTunes Top 40.

Track listing

 Circles - 4:18
 Sixes & Sevens - 2:52
 You Can't Take It With You - 4:28
 Go Easy - 4:49
 Duermete - 8:19
 In Case of Rapture - 5:03
 We's Been Waitin' - 3:42
 Is This Tomorrow? - 3:54
 Sleepyhead - 3:14
 The Narrows - 4:25
 Lost My Mind - 6:14
 (track 11 includes hidden bonus song Asleep in the Sea featuring Kimbra on vocals)

Limited edition

The limited edition includes a DVD (featuring making-of material and live footage) and three extra bonus tracks:
<LI> Home Is Where You're Happy - 1:54
<LI> That's What You Get - 2:39
<LI> Sleepyhead (Acoustic Version) - 3:15

Deluxe edition

The deluxe edition features the same bonus tracks as the limited edition, as well as the DVD. It also includes an exclusive EP of instrumental songs.

Instrumental EP
 Drummy
 I Thought I Knew You
 Spector
 Persian Lullaby

iTunes bonus track version

The iTunes bonus track version has four bonus tracks:
<LI> Sleepyhead (Acoustic Version)
<LI> The Sweet Hereafter
<LI> Where The Green Grass Grows
<LI> Home Is Where You're Happy

Other recorded tracks

Other track titles mentioned by the band which may become b-sides include:
 Paris
 White Elephant
 To the Sound

References

As Tall as Lions albums
2009 albums
Triple Crown Records albums